Nathan Yau is an American statistician and data visualization expert.

Early life
Nathan Chun-Yin Yau grew up in Fresno, California.

He received a Bachelor of Science in electrical engineering and computer science from the University of California, Berkeley. He graduated in 2007 with a Master of Science and in 2013 with a PhD in statistics from the University of California, Los Angeles.

His dissertation was titled "An Online Tool for Personal Data Collection and Exploration" and focused on self-surveillance techniques. Yau's earlier self-surveillance work on the "Personal Environmental Impact Report" was featured in Yau's chapter of the book Beautiful Data, published in 2009.

Career
Yau is known for his blog FlowingData in which he publishes writing and tutorials on information design and analytics, as well as visualizations and data science-related projects created by other professionals.

He is the author of books "Visualize This: The FlowingData Guide to Design, Visualization, and Statistics" (2011) and "Data Points: Visualization That Means Something" (2013).

Since 2014, Yau has worked at the U.S. Census as a research mathematical statistician.

Selected publications

References 

Living people
Digital artists
Information graphic designers
Data scientists
People from Fresno, California
UC Berkeley College of Engineering alumni
University of California, Los Angeles alumni
Year of birth missing (living people)
United States Census Bureau people